Narenta is an unincorporated community in Delta County, in the U.S. state of Michigan.

History
The community was named after the Narenta river in Europe.

References

Unincorporated communities in Delta County, Michigan